Franklyn Edwards (12 September 1937 – 7 June 2019) was a Montserratian cricketer. He played in three first-class matches for the Leeward Islands between 1959 and 1965. He was also the president of the Montserrat Cricket Team and also the president of the Leeward Islands Cricket Association.

See also
 List of Leeward Islands first-class cricketers

References

External links
 

1937 births
2019 deaths
Montserratian cricketers
Leeward Islands cricketers
Place of birth missing
West Indian cricket administrators